Bristol North West is a constituency represented in the House of Commons of the UK Parliament since 2017 by Darren Jones of the Labour Party.

Constituency profile 
The seat covers northwest parts of Bristol, extending to the Severn Estuary. It includes deprived areas such as Lawrence Weston and Southmead, as well as wealthier areas including Westbury-on-Trym and Stoke Bishop.

History 
Party positions altered completely in 2010 with the Liberal Democrat candidate, Paul Harrod achieving second place with a slightly larger one party swing, of 11.4%, than winning candidate Charlotte Leslie and saw a fresh Labour Party candidate suffer a large decrease in percentage of the Labour vote of 20.8%. This changed in 2015 with the Conservatives winning the seat with an increased majority of 9.5%, and Labour moving back into second place. In the snap 2017 general election, the seat was lost to the Labour Party on a swing of 9%.

The 2017 win was a surprise to the successful Labour candidate Darren Jones. He attributes his win to three factors: Corbyn and a good Labour manifesto, the youth vote, and Europe (the constituency had voted 61% remain).

Boundaries 

1950–1955: The County Borough of Bristol wards of Avon, Durdham, Horfield, and Westbury-on-Trym.

1955–1983: The County Borough of Bristol wards of Avon, Henbury, Horfield, Southmead, and Westbury-on-Trym.

1983–1997: The City of Bristol wards of Avonmouth, Henbury, Horfield, Kingsweston, Lockleaze, Southmead, and Westbury-on-Trym, and the District of Northavon wards of Filton Charborough, Filton Conygre, Filton Northville, Stoke Gifford North, and Stoke Gifford South.

1997–2010: The City of Bristol wards of Avonmouth, Henbury, Horfield, Kingsweston, Lockleaze, and Southmead, and the South Gloucestershire wards of Filton Charborough, Filton Conygre, Filton Northville, Patchway Callicroft, Patchway Coniston, Patchway Stoke Lodge, Stoke Gifford North, and Stoke Gifford South.

2010–present: The City of Bristol wards of Avonmouth, Henbury, Henleaze, Horfield, Kingsweston, Lockleaze, Southmead, Stoke Bishop, and Westbury-on-Trym.

The constituency boundary extends into the Severn Estuary and includes the uninhabited islands of Flat Holm and Steep Holm.

Following the review by the Boundary Commission for England into parliamentary representation in the former county of Avon Somerset and Gloucestershire the constituency had boundary changes at the 2010 general election. In particular, the constituency is now wholly contained within the City of Bristol: the areas of Filton, Patchway, Stoke Gifford, Bradley Stoke and Aztec West which are in the South Gloucestershire district were transferred to a new Filton and Bradley Stoke constituency. At the same time, the areas of Stoke Bishop, Henleaze and Westbury-on-Trym were gained from Bristol West.

Members of Parliament

Elections

Elections in the 2010s

Elections in the 2000s

Elections in the 1990s

Elections in the 1980s

Elections in the 1970s

Elections in the 1960s

Elections in the 1950s 

 Constituency created 1950 from parts of Bristol West and Thornbury constituencies

See also 
List of parliamentary constituencies in Avon

Notes

References

External links 
nomis Constituency Profile for Bristol North West — presenting data from the ONS annual population survey and other official statistics.

North West
Constituencies of the Parliament of the United Kingdom established in 1950